Kimberly Nichole Wayans (born October 16, 1961) is an American actress and comedian. Wayans is the sister of Keenen Ivory, Damon Sr., Marlon, Shawn and Nadia Wayans. She is best known for her numerous roles on the Fox sketch comedy show In Living Color (1990–94), and Tonia Harris on In the House (1995–98).

Early life
Wayans was born in New York City, the daughter of Elvira Alethia (Green), a homemaker and social worker, and Howell Stouten Wayans, a supermarket manager. Wayans is one of ten siblings, several of whom have become actors and comedians. She and her family lived in New York City's Chelsea neighborhood, and were Jehovah's Witnesses. Wayans graduated from Wesleyan University, where she studied English.

Career
Wayans made her film debut in Hollywood Shuffle (1987). Her earliest roles on television included a guest appearance on China Beach and as Allison on A Different World during its first season. In film, she portrayed minor characters in I'm Gonna Git You Sucka (1989) and A Low Down Dirty Shame (1994). Both films were directed by her brother Keenen Ivory Wayans. 

She starred with her siblings on the Fox variety show In Living Color. Wayans was a part of the cast at its outset in 1990, where she did celebrity impressions of Naomi Campbell, Whitney Houston, Vanessa Williams and Oprah Winfrey.

Regarding original characters, one reviewer opined she was "hysterical" as Mrs. Brooks and another claimed Wayans played Benita Butrell "to perfection." She left the series along with her brothers Keenen Ivory and Damon in 1993, after a dispute between Fox and the three Wayanses regarding reruns and syndication.

In 1996, Wayans joined the cast of sitcom In the House as Tonia. She provided the voice of Mrs. Wayne on short-lived cartoon Waynehead. She appeared as Mrs. Johnson in Don't Be a Menace to South Central While Drinking Your Juice in the Hood (1996), and had a starring role in the art film Talking About Sex. She also appeared in two episodes as Sheila on The Wayans Bros. starring her younger brothers Marlon and  Shawn. Wayans co-starred in Juwanna Mann (2002) as basketball player Latisha Jansen.  

Wayans then worked as a story editor on her brother Damon's sitcom My Wife and Kids. In 2008, she co wrote a series of children's books with her husband Kevin Knotts, titled Amy Hodgepodge, about a multiracial girl adjusting to life in public school after years of homeschooling.

Known predominantly as a comedian, Wayans claims to have struggled finding roles in other mediums. However, in 2011, she was cast as Audrey, a mother who struggles to understand her seventeen-year-old daughter in the drama film Pariah. According to director Dee Rees, Wayans was chosen in the role as she was the only actress to give Audrey "vulnerability" in her audition. Wayans was nominated for a Black Reel Award and NAACP Image Award in 2012, both in the category of Outstanding Supporting Actress.

Following Pariah, Wayans has acted in more dramatic fare, including guest spots on Criminal Minds and Hawaii Five-0. Her turn on the former led to a regular role as paralegal Vi Briggs on Reckless. She appeared as a doctor on The Soul Man and portrayed Susan on New Girl. Wayans returned to sketch comedy on A Black Lady Sketch Show in 2021, appearing in one episode.

In Living Color

Impressions
Altovise Davis
La Toya Jackson
Esther Rolle
Crystal Waters
Grace Jones
LaWanda Page
Oprah Winfrey
Tracy Chapman
Della Reese
Lynne Thigpen
Whitney Houston
Vanessa L. Williams
Cree Summer
Tina Turner
Sandra "Pepa" Denton
Telma Hopkins
Dionne Warwick
Lucille Ball

Characters
 Benita Butrell
 Cousin Elsee
 Laquita (I Love Laquita)
 Lil' Magic
 Mrs. Brooks
 Reesie (Cephus & Reesie)

Filmography

Film

Television

References

External links 
 
 

1961 births
American people of Malagasy descent
Actresses from New York City
African-American female comedians
Television producers from New York City
American television writers
Living people
Kim
Wesleyan University alumni
American women comedians
American women television writers
Film producers from New York (state)
American impressionists (entertainers)
20th-century American actresses
21st-century American actresses
American voice actresses
American television actresses
African-American actresses
Comedians from New York City
Screenwriters from New York (state)
American women film producers
20th-century American comedians
21st-century American comedians
People from Chelsea, Manhattan
20th-century African-American women
20th-century African-American people
21st-century African-American women
21st-century African-American people